Armen Elbakyan (born February 11, 1954) is an Armenian actor, director and producer.

Career 

In 1974, graduated from the Acting Department of Yerevan Theatre Institute 
In 1981, graduated from the Directing Department of Yerevan Theatre Institute
In the years 1975-1982 – actor for the Sundukyan State Academic Theatre of Yerevan
1982-1988 – director of the Sundukyan State Academic Theatre of Yerevan
1988–1994 years – the artistic director of the Paronyan Musical Comedy Theatre of Yerevan
From 1989 –2012 years – Yerevan Theatre Institute
1994 – Founder of the Drama and Comedy Theater after Edgar Elbakyan
2000-2015 – Artistic Director - General Manager  of the Yerevan State Marionettes Theatre
Since 2012 – Head of Directing the Armenian State Pedagogical University Abovyan
Since 2015 – Artistic Director of the Sundukyan State Academic Theatre of Yerevan

Director
"The Owner" by Hrant Matevosyan
"The Forty Days of Musa Dagh" by Franz Werfel
"The Resistible Rise of Arturo Ui" by Bertolt Brecht
"Play Strindberg", "Physics" by Friedrich Dürrenmatt
"Don Quixote" by Miguel de Cervantes
"The Zoo Story" by Edward Albee
"Desire Under the Elms" by Eugene O'Neill
"The Glass Menagerie", "Suddenly, Last Summer" by Tennessee Williams
"Christmas at the Cupiello's" by Eduardo De Filippo
"The Dragon" by Eugene Schwartz
"Trees Die Standing" by Alejandro Casona
"White elephants" by Ernest Hemingway
" Mean ","George Dandin, or the Abashed Husband" by Molière
"Macbeth" by William Shakespeare
"Premiere" by L. Roseba
"Oh, these doors" by  M. Fermo
"Proposal" by Anton Chekhov
"Dear Elena", "Garden without land" by Lyudmila Razumovskaya
"The Dawns Here Are Quiet" by Boris Vasilyev
"Hanuma" by Avksenty Tsagareli
"Cavemen", "Would You Dance with Me" "You walk into the world",  "Play  Saroyan" by William Saroyan
"Ruined Family" by Gabriel Sundukyan
"Eastern Dentist", "Honorable Beggars", "Brother Baghdasar" by Hakob Paronyan
"Belated Bird" by Anna and Armen Elbakyan
"And paused a moment ..." by Edgar Elbakyan Jr.
"Nazar the Brave", "King Chah-chah", "The Unlucky Panos" by Hovhannes Tumanyan
"Meeting mice" by Atabek Khnkoyan

Actor
Rostom – "The Owner" by Hrant Matevosyan
Joe – "Would You Dance with Me" by William Saroyan
Kurt – "Play Strindberg" by Friedrich Dürrenmatt
Mebius – "Physics" by Friedrich Dürrenmatt
Chatsky – "Woe from Wit" by Griboyedov
Man – "Belated Bird" by Anna and Armen Elbakyan
Jerry – "Two in the Zoo" by  E. Albee
Georges – "Mystery Castle Entauz" by A. Christie
Garcia – "Behind Closed Doors" by Sartre
Georges – "Taxi" by J. Renard
Mercutio – "Romeo and Juliet" by William Shakespeare
Jester – "King John" William Shakespeare
Antonio – "Cylinder" by E. De Filippo
Francois – "Oh, these doors" by M. Fermo
Sergeant rubbed – "Mousetrap" by A. Christie
Evdokimov – "104 pages about love" by E. Radzinsky
Nikita – "Cruel Intentions" by Arbuzov
Sasha – "Natasha" by Arbuzov
Dudley Bostwick – "Time of Your Life" by William Saroyan
Simon – "Land of Nairi" Charents
Crazy Mozi, Osep – "Busted home" by Gabriel Sundukyan
And so on – "New deoginez" by Gabriel Sundukyan
Nico – "Eastern Dentist" by Paronyan
Sacco – "Brave Nazar" by D. Demirchyan
A. Zarabyan – "Hatsavan" by N. Zarian

Awards

1988 – Winner of the  Union festival play  Dear Elena"
1993 – Prize  Vakhtangov for the best works - "Dear Elena," "Garden without land" L. Razumovskaya
2002 – Armenian NationalAward  "Artavazd" - The Best Performance "Busted home" G. Sundukyan
2003 – Honored Art Worker of Armenia
2006 – Armenian NationalAward  "Artavazd" -The BestPerformance  "Man of La Mancha" M. Cervantes
2008 – International TheatreFestival «ARCUSFEST» Hungary - Best Actor
2008 – Armenian NationalAward  "Artavazd" - Best Actor
2010 – Award Festival. A. Ayvazyan in the "Best Actor", "American adzhabsandal"
2010 – Was awarded the title of Professor

External links
Armen Elbakyan's biography
http://www.kino-teatr.ru/kino/acter/m/post/235652/bio/

http://www.rau.am/gazeta_kp/index.php?p=7&stid=321&yn=2012&mn=2&dn=26
https://archive.today/20121229222306/http://azg.am/RU/mail_author/2008070403
https://archive.today/20121229202501/http://www.golos.am/index.php?option=com_content&task=view&id=23693&Itemid=53

1954 births
Living people
Armenian male stage actors
Male actors from Yerevan
Armenian theatre directors